Tadepalle or Tadepalli may refer to :

Geography
Tadepalligudem, a city in West Godavari district of Andhra Pradesh, India
Tadepalle, Guntur district, a town in Andhra Pradesh, India
Tadepalle, Krishna district, a village in Krishna district, Andhra Pradesh, India
Tadepalle, West Godavari district, a village in West Godavari district, Andhra Pradesh, India

Mandals
Tadepalle mandal, Guntur district, a mandal in Andhra Pradesh, India
Tadepalligudem mandal, a mandal in West Godavari district, Andhra Pradesh, India

Urban local bodies
Tadepalle Municipality, a municipality in Andhra Pradesh, India
Tadepalligudem Municipality, a municipality in Andhra Pradesh, India